Eagulls were an English rock band, formed in Leeds in 2009.  The band consisted of Mark Goldsworthy (guitar), Henry Ruddel (drums), Liam Matthews (guitar), Tom Kelly (bass), and George Mitchell (vocals).

History
Eagulls were formed in 2009 and released their first single 'Council Flat Blues' on Moshi Moshi imprint Not Even Records. The band's 2012 self-titled EP, recorded by MJ of Hookworms, was released on both London's Sexbeat label and Canadian label Deranged Records.  In 2013 the band signed to Partisan Records, releasing 7" single "Nerve Endings" with a cover of Killing Joke's 'Requiem', and 7" single 'Tough Luck' (with 'Opaque' on the 7" as well). Their self-titled debut album has been released in March 2014.

The band have received sustained press attention, such as from the NME, The Guardian, Loud and Quiet, Vice, Stereogum, Yorkshire Evening Post, and internationally, such as from The Fader and Pitchfork Media. They were BBC Radio 6's Steve Lamacq's New Favourite Band in 2013. They have played in the UK and Europe with notable artists including Manic Street Preachers, Flipper, Milk Music, Ceremony, Iceage, Hot Snakes, and Pulled Apart By Horses, and in the United States for South by Southwest in Texas and New York's CMJ festivals. In 2014 they appeared on the Late Show with David Letterman, performing their song 'Possessed' for Bill Murray. The band were chosen as the main support for Franz Ferdinand's 2014 UK tour.

In May 2016, the band released their second album, Ullages, on Partisan Records. Produced by Matt Peel, the title is an anagram of the band's name.

In May 2021, singer George Mitchell confirmed during an interview that he left the band a few years ago. He's now a painter and has started a new musical project called "Honesty".

Discography

Studio albums

EP & Singles
Songs Of Prey - Kirky's Records, Cassette (2010)
Council Flat Blues - Moshi Moshi Records/Not Even Records, 7" (2011)
Eagulls/Mazes split - Italian Beach Babes, 7"/MP3 (2011) 
Eagulls EP - Deranged Records/Sexbeat, 12"/MP3 (2012)
Nerve Endings - Partisan Records, 7"/MP3 (2013)
Tough Luck/Opaque - Partisan Records, 7"/MP3 (2013)

References

External links 

 Eagulls on Partisan Records
 

Post-punk groups from Leeds
2010 establishments in England
2016 disestablishments in England
Musical groups established in 2010
Musical groups disestablished in 2016
NME Awards winners
Knitting Factory Records artists
Partisan Records artists